Rasun may refer to:

 Rasun, village is located in the Ajloun Governorate in northern Jordan. 
 Rasun-Anterselva, a municipality in South Tyrol in northern Italy.